Maureen Dakin is an American politician who served in the Vermont House of Representatives. She was the Representative for the Chittenden-9-2 district from 2015 to 2019 and Representative for the Chittenden-7-2 district from 1996 to 2004.

References

Living people
University of Vermont alumni
21st-century American politicians
21st-century American women politicians
Members of the Vermont House of Representatives
Women state legislators in Vermont
People from Proctor, Vermont
Year of birth missing (living people)